Restless is the debut studio album by Australian band Amy Meredith released on 2 July 2010. The album debuted on the ARIA Albums Chart at number eight and spent seven weeks in the ARIA top 50.

Critical reception 

Restless has received mostly negative reviews from critics. Allmusic focused heavily on similarities to the Killers and a lack of originality. The AU Review gave another negative review, saying "Unfortunately after "Faded White Dress", the CD starts to sound all too the same. Catchy songs, yes, but nothing to really make me overly excited", before going on to describe a lack of versatility and other shortcomings. Only a fan review in Future Entertainment gave the album seven stars, posting that "It’s almost unnatural to inhibit yourself, and not start moving to the sounds of album."

Track listing
Standard edition
"Black Eyes" – 3:40
"Pornstar" – 3:16
"Lying" – 3:00
"Young at Heart" – 3:51
"Faded White Dress" – 3:08
"Closer" – 2:43
"Late Nights" – 3:09
"Carry On" – 3:07
"Kiss Me Quick" – 2:59
"Born to Live" – 3:28
"Spin Me Around" – 3:22
"Start All Over Again" – 4:20

Digital bonus tracks
"Highest Walls" (iTunes exclusive) – 3:37
"Violent" (Bandit.fm exclusive) – 3:27

Singles 
 "Pornstar" was released on 23 October 2009 and peaked at number 65 on the ARIA Singles Chart.
 "Lying" debuted on the ARIA Singles Chart at number 27, before peaking at number 10.
 "Young at Heart" was released in September 2010 and debuted on the ARIA Singles Chart at number 68 before falling off.
 "Faded White Dress" was released on 17 November 2010 but did not chart on the ARIA Singles Chart.

Charts

Personnel 
 Christian Lo Russo – vocals, keyboards
 Joel Chapman – lead & rhythm guitars
 Cameron Laing – lead & rhythm guitars
 Wade Osborn – bass guitars
 Kosta Theodosis – drums, percussions
 Robert Conley – co-writer and producer
 Brian Paturalski – producer

Release history

References

External links
 Official site
 Amy Meredith at Facebook
 Amy Meredith at YouTube
 Amy Meredith at Myspace
 Amy Meredith at Twitter
 Amy Meredith at iTunes

2010 debut albums
Amy Meredith albums
Sony Music Australia albums